Exhale is the eighth studio album by Thousand Foot Krutch. The Fuel Music released the album on June 17, 2016.

The album debuted at number 34 on the US Billboard 200, selling 14,000 copies.

Critical reception

Awarding the album four stars at CCM Magazine, Andy Argyrakis writes, "[they sound] more confident and committed to fighting the good fight than ever before." Danielle Martin, rating the album four stars from HM Magazine, states, "Exhale is a bold proclamation of standing strong in their roots." Giving the album four stars by New Release Today, Mary Nikkel describes, "Exhale is full-bodied, infectious rock at its finest, empowering and emboldening listeners even as it serves up searing vocals and thunderous guitar riffs." Scott Mertens, indicating in three and a half review from The Phantom Tollbooth, says, "Exhale finds the group back to full-speed aggressive rock [...] for the most part, seems custom made for live performances. This could be the summer rocker for the CCM concertgoer with something between revolt and hope throughout." Signaling in a three star review by Today's Christian Entertainment, Abby Baracskai believes, "the album brings rock right to your front door in various heights and levels [...] The quality of the musical aspects of the album may be magnificent, but the lyrics can be a little lackluster." Chris Major, allocating the album 4.7 stars for The Christian Beat, responds, "Exhale is heavy, gritty, explosive, and bold, saturated with uncontainable energy from start to finish."

Christopher Smith, allotting the album three and a half stars by Jesus Freak Hideout, writes, "Exhale is far from a letdown, but it could certainly afford to take more risks. Part of the problem lies in having 11 rock songs in a row." Affixing a three and a half star review upon the album at Jesus Freak Hideout, Lucas Munachen says, "It may not be the return to form fans were hoping for, but it does remind us of why we fell in love with the band in the first place." Dylan O'Conner, bestowing a four star review upon the album from Jesus Freak Hideout, states, "it's a solid rock album. It may not be their best offering, but it's a worthy addition to the band's library." Rewarding the album with four stars at Jesus Freak Hideout, Sarah Berdon describes, "Though Exhale is full of components one has heard on previous albums, this record has many highlights, and fans of Thousand Foot Krutch will not want to miss this installment." Michael Weaver, awarding the album four stars by Jesus Freak Hideout, replies, "Thankfully, after the long held breath between albums, Exhale spells redemption. Exhale is more cohesive, features a better overall flow, and is probably their best work since Welcome to the Masquerade."

Track listing

Personnel 
Credits adapted from AllMusic

Thousand Foot Krutch
 Trevor McNevan – lead and backing vocals, guitar, producer
 Joel Bruyere – bass guitar
 Steve Augustine – drums, percussion

Additional personnel
 Aaron Sprinkle – producer, additional guitars on "Honest"
 Phil X – additional guitars
 Brad Blackwood – mastering
 Ryan Clark – art direction, design
 Jr McNeely – mixing
 Brooks Reynolds – band photos

Charts

References

2016 albums
Thousand Foot Krutch albums
Albums produced by Aaron Sprinkle